The Pastures of Heaven is a short story cycle by John Steinbeck, first published in 1932, consisting of twelve interconnected stories about a valley, the Corral de Tierra, in Monterey, California, which was discovered by a Spanish corporal while chasing runaway Indian slaves. Enchanted by the valley's natural beauty, the corporal names it Las Pasturas del Cielo or "The Pastures of Heaven." The stories are written in classic Steinbeck style; the lives of the families that relocate to the valley are portrayed with a mixture of humor and poignance. A recurring theme in the book is the pain caused when people try ineptly to help or to please others.

Steinbeck characterized Carmel Valley, California as “Pastures of Heaven.”

{{blockquote|They climbed stiffly from their seats and stood on the ridge peak and looked down into the Pastures of Heaven. And the air was as golden gauze in the last of the sun. The land below them was plotted in squares of green orchard trees and in squares of yellow grain and in squares of violet earth. From the sturdy farmhouses, set in their gardens, the smoke of the evening fires drifted upward until the hillbreeze swept it cleanly off. Cowbells were softly clashing in the valley; a dog barked so far away that the sound rose up to the travelers in sharp little whispers. Directly below the ridge a band of sheep had gathered under an oak tree against the night.
"It's called Las Pasturas del Cielo," the driver said. "They raise good vegetables there good berries and fruit earlier here than any place else. The name means Pastures of Heaven."|John Steinbeck}}

In the arts
In the story "Junius Maltby", one of the characters regards Robert Louis Stevenson's Travels with a Donkey in the Cevennes as one of the greatest works of English literature and eventually names his infant son Robert Louis. Steinbeck was later inspired by Stevenson in choosing to title his account of his cross-country voyage with a gray-haired poodle in the 1960s, Travels With Charley: In Search of America.

Legacy
The grounds of the schoolhouse in which many chapters are set is still in use by the Washington Union School District where fourth and fifth grade are taught.

Adaptations
A stage adaptation of The Pastures of Heaven done as a collaboration between the California Shakespeare Theater and Word for Word Performing Art Company (a company that stages short stories literally word for word) premiered in Orinda, California, in June 2010. The script was by Octavio Solis, and it was directed by California Shakespeare Theater's artistic director Jonathan Moscone.

References

Further reading
 Martock, Melanie. "The Eden Myth as Paradox: An Allegorical Reading of Pastures of Heaven." Steinbeck Quarterly 11.01 (Winter 1978): 6-15.
 Hearle, Kevin. "The Pastures of Contested Pastoral Discourse." Steinbeck Quarterly 26.01-02 (Winter/Spring 1993): 38-45.
 Winn, Harbour. "The Unity of Steinbeck's Pastures'' Community." Steinbeck Quarterly 22.03-04 (Summer/Fall 1989): 91-103.

External links
 

1932 short story collections
20th-century short stories
American short story collections
History of Monterey County, California
Short stories set in California
Short story collections by John Steinbeck